Lamidorcadion is a genus of longhorn beetles of the subfamily Lamiinae.

COL identifier: 637T3

Species
 Lamidorcadion annulipes Pic, 1934
 Lamidorcadion laosense Breuning, 1968
 Lamidorcadion tuberosum Holzschuh, 1993

References

Morimopsini